1990 is a British then-futuristic political drama television series produced by the BBC and shown in 1977 and 1978.

Summary 
The series is set in a dystopian future in which Britain is under the grip of the Home Office's Public Control Department (PCD), a tyrannically oppressive bureaucracy riding roughshod over the population's civil liberties.

Dubbed "Nineteen Eighty-Four plus six" by its creator, Wilfred Greatorex, 1990 stars Edward Woodward as journalist Jim Kyle, Robert Lang as the powerful PCD Controller Herbert Skardon, Barbara Kellerman as PCD Deputy Controller Delly Lomas, John Savident, Yvonne Mitchell (in her last role), Lisa Harrow, Tony Doyle, Michael Napier Brown, and Clive Swift.

Two series, of eight episodes each, were produced and broadcast on BBC2 in 1977 and 1978. The series was never repeated but was released on DVD in 2017. Two novelisations based on the scripts were released in paperback by the publisher Sphere; Wilfred Greatorex's 1990, and Wilfred Greatorex's 1990 Book Two.

Jim Kyle (Edward Woodward) is a journalist on the last independent newspaper, called The Star, who turns renegade and fights the PCD covertly. The officials of the PCD – headed by Controller Herbert Skardon (Robert Lang) – in turn, try to find proof of Kyle's subversive activities. Skardon's two Deputy Controllers are Delly Lomas (Barbara Kellerman), who has an ambiguous personal relationship with Kyle, and Henry Tasker (Clifton Jones); however, in the second series, these two Deputies were replaced by Lynn Blake (Lisa Harrow), a former love interest of Kyle's. (In the novelisation of episodes from Series Two, the explanation given for the replacement of Delly Lomas was that she had been "relegated to obscurity in the Dundee Branch of the PCD"; no explanation is given for Henry Tasker's departure.) Kyle was aided and abetted by Import/Export Agent Dave Brett (Tony Doyle) and provided from time to time with Top Secret government information by the mysterious "Faceless" (Paul Hardwick), who is a top-level government official tapped into the PCD. The whole government machine is headed by Home Secretary Dan Mellor (John Savident), replaced in office in Series Two (supposedly through Kyle's efforts) by Kate Smith (Yvonne Mitchell).

Background 
Exposition in this series was mainly performed by facts occasionally dropped into dialogue requiring the viewer to piece together the basic scenario.

This state of affairs was precipitated by an irrecoverable national bankruptcy in 1981, triggering martial law followed by a general election in which only 20% of the electorate voted. The economy (and imports) drastically contracted forcing stringent rationing of housing, goods and services.  These are distributed according to a person's LifeScore as determined (and constantly reviewed) by the PCD on behalf of the union-dominated socialist government. As a consequence, the higher-status individuals appear to be civil servants and union leaders. An exception to this are import/export agents, who appear to be immune to state control due to their importance to the remnants of the economy. The House of Lords has been abolished and turned into an exclusive dining club. State ownership of businesses appears to be close to 100% and prohibition of wealth and income appears to be very high. The reigning monarch is male due to the unfortunate death of the previous monarch (Elizabeth II) but his identity is never made clear. The currency is the Anglodollar (which replaced the pound sterling in 1982 due to hyperinflation) which appears to have little value overseas due to the international boycott of British exports. The armed forces have been run down to the extent that they are little more than an internal security force. This is made clear in one episode where the RAF is depicted as consisting of little more than a handful of Harrier jump jets and a few dozen counter-insurgency helicopters. Despite this National Service has been re-introduced (via the Youth Behaviour Control Act 1984 which enforces conscription). The Genetic Crimes Act 1985 makes sexual offences punishable by execution. It is said that in 1986 two army generals and a retired air chief marshal attempted a coup against the government, but it failed.

Although running the bureaucratic dictatorship, the state appears to shy away from explicit political violence, preferring to set up psychiatric pseudo-hospitals called "Adult Rehabilitation Centres" which employ electro-convulsive treatments to 'cure' dissidents.  Ordinary criminals found guilty of traditional and new economic and social crimes are prevented from clogging up the prison system by having short sentences during which they are force-fed "misery pills" (via the Oral Swallowing Induction Device), which induce severe depression and agony during their incarceration.  Despite this, fatalities and injuries do occur due to the PCD's lack of democratic accountability but these are misreported or ignored by the state-controlled press and television or are suppressed by the print unions on the last independent newspaper in the UK.  The state can also declare a person to be a "non-citizen" which denies them any entitlement whatsoever to consumer goods, accommodation or food. (This often happens to sex offenders, even ones who have served their sentence and been released.) Labour is controlled by a mandatory closed shop in every workplace. For at least part of the series, the country is on a three-day working week, presumably to conserve energy or to promote full employment through job sharing. Taking a second job ("moonlighting") is illegal, as is "parasitism", defined as claiming state benefits while fit for work. Ombudsman's Courts which are fixed in favour of the state are the key part of the legal system.

Emigration is a key problem with a steady "brain drain" countered by PCD Emigration officers who try to watch every port and airfield. Despite this, professional and skilled labour is fast disappearing from the country in a similar manner to East Germany before the fall of the Berlin Wall.

Episodes

Series 1 (1977)

Series 2 (1978)

DVD release 

Simply Media released 1990 on DVD in the UK during 2017.

External links 
 

BBC television dramas
British science fiction television shows
1977 British television series debuts
1978 British television series endings
1970s British drama television series
Dystopian television series
English-language television shows
1970s British science fiction television series
Television series set in 1990
Television series set in the future